The Dream Doctor is a 1936 British drama film directed by Widgey R. Newman and starring Leo Genn, Sydney Moncton and Yvonne Murray. The film was a quota quickie produced by the independent producer Newman for distribution by the Hollywood studio MGM.

Cast
 Julie Suedo as Gipsy
 Sydney Monckton as Doctor
 Margaret Yarde
 Yvonne Murray as Patient
 Peter Cousins
 Thelma Sheehan
 Leo Genn as Husband  
 Jennifer Skinner

References

Bibliography
 Chibnall, Steve. Quota Quickies: The British of the British 'B' Film. British Film Institute, 2007.
 Low, Rachael. Filmmaking in 1930s Britain. George Allen & Unwin, 1985.
 Wood, Linda. British Films, 1927-1939. British Film Institute, 1986.

External links

1936 films
British drama films
British black-and-white films
1936 drama films
Films directed by Widgey R. Newman
Quota quickies
1930s English-language films
1930s British films